Alan Javier Franco (born 11 October 1996) is an Argentinian professional footballer who plays as a centre-back for Campeonato Brasileiro Série A club São Paulo.

Club career

Independiente
Born in Avellaneda, Franco joined Independiente in January 2015, from San Telmo. On 20 December 2016, he signed his first professional contract with the club, agreeing to a deal until 2020, and was promoted to the main squad shortly after.

Franco made his first team – and Primera División – debut on 18 March 2017, starting in a 0–0 home draw against San Martín de San Juan. He scored his first professional goal on 12 July, netting the first in a 4–2 Copa Sudamericana home defeat of Deportes Iquique.

Franco became a starter under Ariel Holan during the 2017 Copa Sudamericana, featuring in both legs of the Final against Flamengo.

Atlanta United
On 8 April 2021, Franco joined Major League Soccer side Atlanta United on a five-year contract as a designated player. He made his debut for the club on 27 April 2021 in the CONCACAF Champions League against the Philadelphia Union, the club losing 3–0.

São Paulo 
On 5 January 2023, Franco joined Brazilian side São Paulo on a permanent deal, signing a three-year contract, with an option for another year.

International career
Franco made his international debut for Argentina on September 8, 2018 in a 3-0 international friendly against the Guatemala national football team.

Honours
Independiente
Copa Sudamericana: 2017

References

External links

1996 births
Living people
Sportspeople from Avellaneda
Argentine footballers
Argentina international footballers
Association football central defenders
Argentine Primera División players
Major League Soccer players
Club Atlético Independiente footballers
Atlanta United FC players
Designated Players (MLS)
Argentine expatriate footballers
Argentine expatriate sportspeople in the United States
Expatriate soccer players in the United States